The Windhoek College of Education (now known as the University of Namibia Khomasdal campus) is public university in Khomasdal, Windhoek, Namibia. It opened in 1978 and is one of four national colleges of education.

Notable alumni
 Christine ǁHoebes, minister of presidential affairs
 Elma Dienda
 Michael Goreseb
 Emma Tuahepa

References

 
Educational institutions established in 1978
1978 establishments in South West Africa